Zygmunt Rozwadowski (25 January 1870 – 23 July 1950) was a Polish painter. His work was part of the painting event in the art competition at the 1928 Summer Olympics.

References

1870 births
1950 deaths
20th-century Polish painters
20th-century Polish male artists
Olympic competitors in art competitions
Artists from Lviv
Polish male painters